State elections were held in South Australia on 2 April 1910. All 42 seats in the South Australian House of Assembly were up for election. The incumbent Liberal and Democratic Union (LDU) government led by Premier of South Australia Archibald Peake was defeated by the United Labor Party (ULP) led by John Verran. Each of the 13 districts elected multiple members, with voters casting multiple votes. The Peake LDU minority government had replaced the Price ULP/LDU coalition government in June 1909. The 1910 election was the first to result in a South Australian majority government. This came two weeks after the election of a first majority in either house in the Parliament of Australia at the 1910 federal election, also for Labor. Though a South Australian majority was won, the ULP did not take office until after the new lower house first met.

Background
Following the election, the LDU merged with the two independent conservative parties – the Australasian National League (ANL, formerly National Defence League (NDL)) and the Farmers and Producers Political Union (FPPU) – to become the Liberal Union (LU). The parties readily approved the merger, however, the LDU which salvaged the fewest of their principles from the merger were more hesitant. Peake persuaded a party conference that 'the day of the middle party is passed', and approved the merger by just one vote. The LU was affiliated with the federal Commonwealth Liberal Party (CLP).

The two-seat multi-member district of Northern Territory was abolished in 1911, reducing the House of Assembly to 40 seats.

Results

 The three anti-Labor parties, the LDU, the ANL and the FPPU endorsed a shared "Liberal" slate of candidates in all but three Assembly seats and the Council, though they would not formally merge as the LU until late 1910, months after the election. The listed "Liberal" figure is for the three parties combined.

See also
 Members of the South Australian House of Assembly, 1910-1912
 Members of the South Australian Legislative Council, 1910–1912

References
History of South Australian elections 1857-2006, volume 1: ECSA
State and federal election results in Australia since 1890

External links
The 13 electorates from 1902 to 1915: The Adelaide Chronicle

Elections in South Australia
1910 elections in Australia
1910s in South Australia
April 1910 events